During the period from 1893 to 1914, the Stanley Cup was a "challenge trophy"; the champions held the Cup until they lost their league title to another club, or a champion from another league issued a formal challenge and subsequently defeated them in a special game or series. The competitive format of each challenge was determined by negotiation between the two clubs, and the contesting clubs did indeed make several arrangements during this 22-year period.

Before 1912, challenges could take place at any time, given the appropriate rink conditions, and it was common for teams to defend the Cup numerous times during the year. In 1912, the Cup's trustees declared that the Cup was only to be defended at the end of the champion team's regular season.

Also during this era, all of the leagues that played for the trophy had no annual formal playoff system to decide their own respective championships; whoever finished in first place after the regular season won the league title. Thus, a few league championship games or series were held just to break first place ties and determine who would keep the Cup. These league title games have historically been listed along with the regular inter-league Cup challenges.

Champions

Lord Stanley of Preston introduced the Stanley Cup in 1892 and it was first awarded at the end of winter 1893 to the league champion Montreal Hockey Club (Montreal HC). The same club won a playoff at the end of the 1894 season, which is considered the first "Stanley Cup challenge" although four clubs were involved in the process and three teams played games. Montreal HC lost the Cup by losing its league in 1895, decided early in March. The challenge system, as opposed to the Challenge Era, probably truly began sometime thereafter.

Season record
This table lists all the champions of the Stanley Cup per hockey season during the challenge era. A season did not have official dates as rinks were natural ice, so season roughly corresponds to winter. The leagues typically started close to the beginning of the calendar year and ended in early March.

Yearly record
This table lists all the champions of the Stanley Cup per year during the challenge era. Annual Stanley Cup Final series did not begin until 1915, before which time there often were two different champions in a single year, and as many as five different championships.

1893–94
The first Stanley Cup playoff game occurred on March 17, 1894. At the end of the Amateur Hockey Association of Canada season, four teams tied for the AHAC championship with records of 5–3–0. This created problems for the AHAC governors and the Cup's trustees since there was no tiebreaking system in place. After long negotiation and the withdrawal of Quebec from the championship situation, it was decided that a three-team tournament would take place in Montreal, with the Ottawa Hockey Club getting a bye to the finals (being the sole "road" team). In the first Stanley Cup playoff game ever, the Montreal Hockey Club defeated the Montreal Victorias, 3–2. Five days later in the first Stanley Cup Final game, the Montreal HC successfully defended their title with a 3–1 win over Ottawa.

Later in the year, the Cup trustees accepted a challenge from the squad from Osgoode Hall, the champions of the Ontario Hockey Association (OHA). However, the series was eventually cancelled because of the lack of ice.

1894–95
On March 8, 1895, the Montreal Victorias won the 1895 AHAC title and thus the Stanley Cup, after finishing the season with a 6–2 record. However, a challenge game was scheduled earlier for the next day between the previous year's champion Montreal HC and the squad from Queen's University, which was then part of the Ontario Hockey Association. Thus, it was decided that if the Montreal HC won the challenge match, the Victorias would become the Stanley Cup champions. The Montreal HC would eventually win the game, 5–1, and their crosstown rivals were crowned the champions.

Billy Barlow, the star player of Montreal was not able to play and Clarence McKerrow took his place. McKerrow had not played any games for Montreal, and could be considered a ringer, but there was no protest from Queen's.

The Queen's team, although described as looking fast in their tiger jerseys, were no match for Montreal and the game proved uninteresting.

1895–96
The first successful challenge to the Cup came in February 1896 by the Winnipeg Victorias, the champions of the Manitoba Hockey Association (MHA). On February 14, Winnipeg beat defending champion Montreal, 2–0, becoming the first team outside the AHAC to win the Cup.

1896–97
The Montreal Victorias won the 1896 AHAC title by finishing the season with a 7–1 record, and subsequently demanded a rematch for the Cup. However, it was delayed until December 30 due to unsuitable ice conditions in Montreal. In what was said to be the most anticipated hockey game of the time, the Montreal Victorias defeated the Winnipeg Victorias, 6–5, to reclaim the Cup.

1897–98
Another 7–1 record earned the Montreal Victorias the 1897 AHAC title, and the team subsequently received a challenge from the Ottawa Capitals, champions of the Central Canada Hockey Association (CCHA). It was originally scheduled as the first best-of-three challenge, but the series ended after the first game because the Victorias clearly was the superior team with a 15–2 victory.

The Montreal Victorias again won the AHAC championship after finishing the 1898 AHAC season undefeated with an 8–0 record. As a result, no one challenged the Victorias for the Cup.

1898–99
Prior to the start of the 1898–99 season, the AHAC dissolved. The defending Cup champion Montreal Victorias along with several other former AHAC members formed the Canadian Amateur Hockey League (CAHL).

Montreal then received another challenge from the MHA's Winnipeg Victorias. This time, it was decided that they would play a two-game total goals series in February 1899.

The second game ended in controversy. With Montreal leading the game 3–2 with about 12 minutes left in the game, Montreal's Bob Macdougall violently slashed Winnipeg's Tony Gingras. As Gingras was carried off the ice, referee Bill Findlay only called Macdougall for a two-minute minor. Angry that he should have been accessed a larger penalty, Winnipeg went into their dressing room in protest. Insulted, Findlay abruptly went home, but returned after officials followed him on a sleigh and persuaded him to return. Once back at the rink, the referee gave Winnipeg 15 minutes to return to the ice themselves. They refused and thus Findlay disqualified the team and declared Montreal the winners.

Two weeks after the Montreal Victorias defeated Winnipeg in their two-game total goals series, they lost the 1899 CAHL title, and thus the Cup, to the Montreal Shamrocks. The Shamrocks compiled a 7–1 season record while the Victorias finished one game back at 6–2. The Shamrocks then played a challenge game against Queen's University on March 14, defeating them 6–2.

1899–1900
The MHA's Winnipeg Victorias issued another challenge for the Cup. This time, a best-of-three series was played against the defending champion Montreal Shamrocks. Winnipeg won the first game, 4–3, but Montreal prevailed in the next two games, 3–2 and 5–4.

In March, the Shamrocks finished the 1900 CAHL season in first place, and thus the league championship, with a 7–1 record and then received another challenge for the Cup. However, the Halifax Crescents of the Halifax City Hockey League (Maritime champions) did not pose much of a threat as Montreal crushed them, 10–2 and 11–0.

1900–01
In January 1901, the Winnipeg Victorias again challenged the Montreal Shamrocks for the Cup. This time, Winnipeg prevailed, sweeping the best-of-three series with scores of 4–3 and 2–1. Game two was the first overtime game in Cup history with Dan Bain scoring at the four-minute mark of the extra period.

1901–02
In January 1902, the OHA's Toronto Wellingtons challenged the Winnipeg Victorias for the Cup in a best-of-three series, but Winnipeg swept Toronto in two games with identical 5–3 scores.

After the Montreal HC won the 1902 CAHL title in March, they promptly sent a challenge to the Winnipeg Victorias. In game one of the best-of-three series, Winnipeg shutout Montreal, 1–0. However, Montreal shutout Winnipeg in game two, 5–0, and then held on to a 2–1 victory in game three. With the victory, the Montreal club won the Cup for the first time since 1894. The win earned the players the nickname of "Little Men of Iron" for their effort in holding off Winnipeg in the closing moments of game three.

1902–03
Another Montreal HC vs. Winnipeg Victorias best-of-three challenge series was held in early 1903. In the first game, defending champion Montreal defeated Winnipeg, 8–1. The second game was the first Stanley Cup challenge match to be replayed. Both teams skated to a 2–2 tie before the game had to be suspended at 27:00 of overtime because of a midnight curfew. It was then decided to discard the result and replay the game two days later. In the rescheduled contest, the Victorias won, 4–2, to even the series. However, Montreal won the decisive third game, 4–1, to retain the Cup.

In March, the 1903 CAHL season ended with the Montreal Victorias and the Ottawa Hockey Club tied for first place with identical 6–2 records. To determine the CAHL champion, and thus succeed the Montreal HC as the Cup champion, a two-game total goals series was held between the two teams. The first game was held in Montreal ending in a 1–1 tie. The second game was played in Ottawa, with the Ottawas dominating the Victorias, 8–0. The Ottawas thus won the Cup by winning the CAHL.

As the new CAHL and Cup champions, the Ottawas accepted a challenge from the Rat Portage Thistles of the Manitoba & Northwestern Hockey Association (MNWHA). Entering the best-of-three challenge series, the Thistles were younger and quicker than Ottawa; only one player on the Thistles was over the age of 20. However, poor soft ice conditions in Ottawa played a major factor as the Ottawas swept the series with scores of 6–2 and 4–2.

For their win, the Ottawa players each received a silver nugget from team director Bob Shillington. This is the origin of the nickname of the Silver Seven.

1903–04

In January 1904, a best-of-three Cup challenge series was held between the defending champion Ottawa Hockey Club (aka Silver Seven) and the MHA's Winnipeg Rowing Club. Ottawa crushed Winnipeg, 9–1, in the first game but the Rowing Club rebounded with a 6–2 victory in the second. The Silver Seven then won the deciding third game, 2–0. This series marked the first time that goal lines were drawn across the ice from post to post.

On January 30, 1904, a CAHL league game between the Ottawas and the Montreal Victorias started late and the game ended at the midnight curfew, with Ottawa leading 4–1. The CAHL ordered the game to be replayed, and the ensuing debate caused the Ottawas to withdraw from the CAHL. The CAHL hoped that without Ottawa, the Cup would remain with the CAHL and be given to its new league champion, the Quebec Bulldogs. However, the Cup trustees decided otherwise, and although the Silver Seven were not affiliated with any league for the rest of the season, they could still receive challenges. About a month later, Ottawa swept a best-of-three Cup series against the OHA's Toronto Marlboros with scores of 6–3 and 11–2.

In early March, the Montreal Wanderers of the Federal Amateur Hockey League (FAHL) challenged the Senators for the Cup. In the first game, played in Montreal, the teams played to a 5–5 tie at the end of regulation and the Wanderers refused to play overtime with the current referee. The Cup trustees ordered the series to restart with both games played in Ottawa. However, Montreal refused unless the first game was replayed at home. The Wanderers were disqualified and the Silver Seven retained the Cup.

A week later, Ottawa HC was challenged by the MNHA's Brandon Wheat City HC, but prevailed in another two game sweep with scores of 6–3 and 9–3.

1904–05
The Ottawa HC joined the FAHL for the 1904–1905 season.

Ottawa vs. Dawson City

In January 1905, the Ottawas were challenged by the Dawson City Nuggets who travelled 4,000 miles (6,400 km) from the Yukon to Ottawa for a best-of-three Cup challenge series. The Nuggets actually left Dawson City on December 19, 1904 and travelled on a month-long journey by dog sled and walking (Dawson to Whitehorse), ship (Skagway to Vancouver), and train (Whitehorse to Skagway, and Vancouver to Ottawa). Largely because of the long trip, they were no match for the Silver Seven. Ottawa defeated Dawson City in the first game by a score of 9–2. Numerous Stanley Cup records were then set in the second game, including Frank McGee's 14 goals, and a 23–2 rout, the largest margin of victory for any challenge game or Stanley Cup Final game to date as of 2020.

Ottawa vs. Rat Portage

Ottawa eventually won the 1905 FAHL title by finishing in first place with a 7–1 record. Then in March, the Rat Portage Thistles issued another challenge to the Ottawas. Although the Thistles crushed Ottawa in the first game, 9–3, Ottawa was without Frank McGee who did not play. However, McGee returned to lead the Ottawas to 4–2 and 5–4 victories in the second and third games to win the series.

On the same day that the third game of the Thistles - Ottawa series was played, the 1905 CAHL season ended with the Montreal Victorias winning the title. The Cup trustees accepted their challenge, however, the Montreal-Ottawa series was eventually cancelled because the trustees and the Victorias could not agree on either the game dates or the playoff series format.

1905–06
For the 1905–06 season, the Ottawa HC (aka Silver Seven) joined the new Eastern Canada Amateur Hockey Association (ECAHA). In February, Ottawa played a best-of-three challenge series against OHA champion Queen's University, but the Senators proved to be the better team as they swept the series with 16–7 and 12–7 victories.

About a week later, Smiths Falls, the FAHL champions, issued a challenge for the Cup, but they suffered the same fate as Queen's University. The Ottawas defeated them with scores of 6–5 and 8–2 to defend the Cup. Ottawa management was so impressed with Smiths Falls goalie Percy LeSueur that they signed him to join the Ottawas a few days after the series ended.

The 1906 ECAHA season ended a few days later after the Smiths Falls - Ottawa series, with both Ottawa and the Montreal Wanderers tied for first place with identical 9–1 records. It was decided to hold a two-game total goals series to determine the league champion, and thus who would keep the Cup. The first game was played in Montreal where the Wanderers promptly crushed the Ottawas, 9–1. Needing at least an eight-goal victory in the rematch in Ottawa, the newly signed LeSueur was named Ottawa's starting goalie, and the Ottawas jumped to a 9–1 lead to tie the series. But with under 5 minutes to go, Montreal's Lester Patrick scored twice to clinch the series for the Wanderers, winning the total-goals series, 12–10 and taking over the Stanley Cup.

1906–07

In December 1906, the New Glasgow Cubs, an amateur team from New Glasgow, Nova Scotia, issued a challenge to the Montreal Wanderers. In a two-game total goals series, Montreal easily defeated New Glasgow in both matches, 10–3 and 7–2. This was the first series in which professional players played for the Stanley Cup, as the Wanderers and other teams in the ECAHA were starting to mix amateurs with pros in their squads.

The Kenora Thistles (formerly the Rat Portage Thistles before the city changed its name to Kenora in 1904) challenged the Montreal Wanderers for the Cup in January 1907. Aided by future Hockey Hall of Famers Tom Hooper, Tommy Phillips, and Art Ross, the Thistles came away with 4–2 and 8–6 victories for a combined score of 12–8 to win a two-game total goals series. A "ringer", Ross was a member of the Brandon Wheat Kings and was borrowed by Kenora just for the challenge games.

In March, Kenora would play and win the Manitoba Professional Hockey League (MPHL) playoffs against Brandon to successfully defend the Cup. In a best-of-three, Kenora won 2–0.

In March, the Wanderers won the 1907 ECAHA title by finishing the season undefeated with a 10–0 record. Montreal then requested a rematch with Kenora for the Cup. However, there were disagreements between both teams. The Wanderers did not want the Thistles to use their "ringers", Harry Westwick and Alf Smith from the Ottawa Senators. Kenora responded by refusing to play, citing the fact that Montreal used "ringers" in the earlier series. Eventually, the Wanderers withdrew their protest after the Thistles agreed to play the two-game total goals series in Winnipeg; Winnipeg Auditorium was much larger and thus guaranteed more ticket sales for the clubs to share. In the end, Montreal overcame Westwick and Smith as they compiled a combined score of 12–8 to win the series. Most of the Wanderers' margin-of-victory came in game one as they defeated the Thistles, 7–2. Kenora won game two, 6–5, but the one-goal victory was not enough.

1907–08

Although the Montreal Wanderers won the 1908 ECAHA title by finishing the season with an 8–2 record, they played in three Cup challenges that season. In January, they defeated the 1907 FAHL champion Ottawa Victorias, 22–4, in a two-game total goals series. Ernie Russell scored 10 goals as he led the Wanderers to 9–3 and 13–1 victories.

The Winnipeg Maple Leafs of the MHL challenged Montreal for the Cup in March, but the Wanderers came away with 11–5 and 9–3 wins to clinch the two-game total goals series, 20–8.

Montreal's greatest challenge happened two days later when they played a single-elimination game against the Toronto Professional HC. Toronto was the champion of the newly established Ontario Professional Hockey League (OPHL), and was the first all-professional team to compete for the Cup. However, the Wanderers prevailed, 6–4, with two late goals by Ernie Johnson and Bruce Stuart.

1908–09
In December 1908, Montreal played its first Cup challenge of the season, this time against the Edmonton Hockey Club of the Alberta Amateur Hockey Association (AAHA). Edmonton entered the series with an all-time high of six "ringers". In game one, Harry Smith scored five goals as he led the Wanderers to a 7–3 victory. The Edmontons won game two, 7–6, but Montreal took the two-game total goals series, 13–10.

Prior to the start of the new season, the Montreal HC and the Montreal Victorias, the last remaining amateur teams, left the ECAHA, and the league dropped "Amateur" from its name to become an all-pro league. The 1909 ECHA season ended with the defending Cup champion Montreal Wanderers finishing in second place with a 9–3 record, behind the first place Ottawa HC who finished at 10–2. Thus Ottawa HC won the league championship and were awarded the Cup.

Ottawa received a challenge only from the Winnipeg Shamrocks, but it was too late in the season to set a date.

1909–10
In an effort to freeze out the Montreal Wanderers, the ECHA disbanded in December 1909 and a new league called the Canadian Hockey Association (CHA) was formed, deliberately designed to exclude the Wanderers. While the Wanderers were forced to join the newly formed National Hockey Association (NHA), the defending Cup champion Ottawa HC still had to accept challenges. In January 1910, they played a two-game total goals series against Galt, champions of the OPHL, but prevailed with 12–3 and 3–1 victories. Marty Walsh led Ottawa with 6 goals.

Soon after the Galt-Ottawa challenge series ended, the CHA folded because of financial difficulties, and Ottawa was admitted into the NHA. The Senators then played a two-game total goals series against the Edmonton Hockey Club, but Gordie Roberts' seven goals helped Ottawa to victories of 8–4 and 13–7.

When the 1910 NHA season ended in March, the Ottawas had to give the Cup to the Wanderers. Montreal finished in first place with an 11–1 record while Ottawa finished in second place at 9–3. The Wanderers then accepted challenge from the Berlin Dutchmen, who succeeded Galt as the OPHL champions. In the single-elimination game, Ernie Russell scored 4 goals as he led Montreal to a 7–3 win.

1910–11
The Ottawa HC captured the NHA championship, and thus the Cup, after finishing the 1910–11 season in first place with a 13–3 record. The Ottawas then played in two Cup challenges during the month of March. In a one-game challenge on March 13, Ottawa defeated the Galt Professionals of the Ontario Professional Hockey League (OPHL), 7–4, aided by three goals by future hall of fame forward Marty Walsh.

Three days later, the Ottawas played the Port Arthur Bearcats of the New Ontario Hockey League (NOHL) in another one-game final. Walsh scored ten goals as Ottawa crushed Port Arthur, 14–4.

1911–12
In 1912, Cup trustees declared that the Cup was only to be defended at the end of the champion team's regular season. As a result, anyone who wanted to challenge for the Cup had to wait until the 1911–12 NHA season concluded. When it ended, the Ottawa HC finished in second place, with a 9–9 record, behind the Quebec Bulldogs, who posted a 10–8 record to take the league championship and take over the Cup. The Bulldogs then went on to sweep the Moncton Victorias of the Maritime Professional Hockey League (MPHL) in a best-of-three Cup challenge series, with 9–3 and 8–0 victories.

1912–13
The 1912–13 NHA season ended with Quebec Bulldogs repeating as league champions. The Bulldogs then played a two-game total goals Cup challenge series versus the Sydney Millionaires of the Maritime Professional Hockey League (MPHL), with Quebec winning 20 goals to 5. Joe Malone scored 9 goals as he led the Bulldogs to a 14–3 win in the first game. Quebec then won the second by a score of 6–2, with Joe Hall earning a hat trick.

Later in the month, the Victoria Aristocrats of the Pacific Coast Hockey Association (PCHA) challenged Quebec. However, the Bulldogs refused to put the Cup on the line, so the two teams played a best-of-three exhibition series instead. In the first series ever between the champions of the two leagues, all of the games were played in Victoria, while the differing rules of the NHA and PCHA alternated between each contest. A major rule difference was the PCHA had seven-man rules while the NHA had six. The first game was played under PCHA rules and the Aristocrats recorded a 7–5 victory. Under NHA rules in the second game, Quebec won 6–3. But in the third game, under seven-man hockey, Victoria won the exhibition series with a 6–1 victory.

1913–14
At the end of the 1913–14 NHA season, the Toronto Hockey Club and the Montreal Canadiens were tied for first place with identical 13–7 records. To determine the NHA title and the new Cup champions, both teams played a two-game total goals series. Each team recorded shutouts on its home ice: Montreal won the first game, 2–0, but Toronto came back to win the second game, 6–0. The Blue Shirts won the series, 6 goals to 2. Game two in Toronto was the first Stanley Cup playoff game ever played on artificial ice.

Later in the month, Toronto and the PCHA's Victoria Aristocrats played a best-of-five series for the Cup. A controversy occurred when it was revealed that the Victoria club had not filed a formal challenge. A letter arrived from the Stanley Cup trustees on March 17, stating that the trustees would not let the Stanley Cup travel west, as they did not consider Victoria a proper challenger because they had not formally notified the trustees. However, on March 18, Trustee William Foran stated that it was a misunderstanding. PCHA president Lester Patrick had not filed a challenge, because he had expected Emmett Quinn of the NHA to make all of the arrangements in his role as hockey commissioner, whereas the trustees thought they were being deliberately ignored. In any case, all arrangements had been ironed out and the Victoria challenge was accepted. As it turned out, the Blue Shirts swept the series to successfully defend the Cup with scores of 5–2, 6–5 in overtime, and 2–1.

Table of participating teams
Legend: SC = successful Stanley Cup challenge or defense of championship (win); UC = unsuccessful Stanley Cup challenge or defense of championship (loss)

The following 16 teams unsuccessfully challenged for a Stanley Cup only once: Berlin Dutchmen, Dawson City Nuggets, Halifax Crescents, Moncton Victorias, Montreal Canadiens, New Glasgow Cubs, Ottawa Capitals, Ottawa Victorias, Port Arthur Bearcats, Smiths Falls, Sydney Millionaires, Toronto HC, Toronto Marlboros, Toronto Wellingtons, Victoria Aristocrats, Winnipeg Rowing Club.

See also
 List of pre-NHL seasons
 List of Stanley Cup champions

References

Citations

Sources 

 
 
 
 
 

Chall